Hasahn French (born March 9, 1998) is an American professional basketball player who last played for Krka of the Premier A Slovenian Basketball League and the ABA League Second Division. He played college basketball for the Saint Louis Billikens.

High school career
French grew up in Middletown, New York and did not play organized basketball until eighth grade, instead playing running back on youth league football teams. After a five-inch growth spurt, he was noticed by Middletown High School coach Jim Kelly and joined the team in eighth grade, helping the team become the Class AA section 9 champions. French transferred to Springfield Commonwealth Academy following his freshman year. As a senior, he had 38 points, 18 rebounds and 10 assists against Brewster Academy. He led the team to winning the Hoophall Classic, defeating Cushing Academy 61–56. French finished with 10 points and 17 rebounds and was named MVP. A four-star recruit, French committed to playing college basketball for Saint Louis over UMass and UNLV.

College career
As a freshman, French averaged 9.3 points and 7.1 rebounds per game and set a Saint Louis freshman record with 59 blocked shots. French was named to the Atlantic 10 All-Rookie Team. In the first round of the 2019 Atlantic 10 Tournament, French scored 22 points and had 12 rebounds in a win over Richmond. As a sophomore, French averaged 9.3 points, 8.4 rebounds, and 1.8 blocks per game on a team that finished 23–13 and reached the NCAA Tournament. He was named to the Third Team All-Atlantic 10 as well as the Defensive Team.

On November 23, 2019, French scored 21 points and pulled down an Atlantic 10 record-tying 24 rebounds in a 60–55 win against Belmont. He was named to the midseason Karl Malone Award watchlist. As a junior, French averaged 12.4 points, 10.4 rebounds, 2.3 assists and 2.6 blocks per game. He led the conference in rebounding and became Saint Louis's all-time leader in blocks. French was named to the Second Team All-Atlantic 10 as well as the Defensive Team. Following the season, he declared for the 2020 NBA draft. On June 3, French withdrew from the draft and opted to return for his senior season. He averaged 9.2 points and 7.4 rebounds per game as a senior.

Professional career
On June 25, 2021, French reportedly signed his first professional contract with Lavrio of the Greek Basket League. However, the transfer never fully materialized. On August 19, he signed with Krka of the Slovenian League.

For the 2022–23 season, French joined the Raptors 905 of the NBA G League. However, he did not make the final roster.

Career statistics

College

|-
| style="text-align:left;"| 2017–18
| style="text-align:left;"| Saint Louis
| 32 || 32 || 30.2 || .535 || .000 || .364 || 7.1 || 1.5 || .8 || 1.8 || 9.3
|-
| style="text-align:left;"| 2018–19
| style="text-align:left;"| Saint Louis
| 36 || 35 || 30.6 || .492 || – || .349 || 8.4 || 1.5 || 1.0 || 1.8 || 9.3
|-
| style="text-align:left;"| 2019–20
| style="text-align:left;"| Saint Louis
| 30 || 30 || 31.9 || .521 || – || .329 || 10.4 || 2.3 || 1.0 || 2.6 || 12.4
|-
| style="text-align:left;"| 2020–21
| style="text-align:left;"| Saint Louis
| 19 || 19 || 25.0 || .533 || – || .326 || 7.4 || 2.4 || .7 || 1.4 || 9.2
|- class="sortbottom"
| style="text-align:center;" colspan="2"| Career
| 117 || 116 || 29.9 || .517 || .000 || .343 || 8.4 || 1.9 || .9 || 1.9 || 10.1

References

External links
Saint Louis Billikens bio

1998 births
Living people
American expatriate basketball people in Slovenia
American men's basketball players
Basketball players from New York (state)
Centers (basketball)
KK Krka players
People from Middletown, Orange County, New York
Power forwards (basketball)
Saint Louis Billikens men's basketball players